Fahad Salim Hadid Obaid Ghraib (born 7 July 1993), commonly known as Fahad Hadeed, is an Emirati footballer who plays for Khor Fakkan as a winger for the UAE national under-20 football team.

Hadeed used to play for Al Sharjah SC since his youth years. He was released on a free transfer following a dispute with the club, he then signed a new contract with Al Wasl FC in December 2011.

References

External links
 Pro-League profile
 

1993 births
Living people
Emirati footballers
People from the Emirate of Sharjah
United Arab Emirates international footballers
Sharjah FC players
Al-Wasl F.C. players
Al-Nasr SC (Dubai) players
Emirates Club players
Khor Fakkan Sports Club players
Al Ain FC players
UAE Pro League players
Association football wingers